Alexander Yevgenyevich Kobrin (Александр Кобрин, born 20 March 1980 in Moscow) is a concert pianist and teacher.

At age five, he enrolled in the Gnessin Special School of Music in Moscow where his primary teacher was Tatiana Zelikman. When he turned eighteen, he enrolled at the Moscow Tchaikovsky Conservatory, as a student of the legendary teacher, Lev Naumov, and he holds a graduate degree from that institution.

As a teenager, Kobrin won several youth piano competitions, but he won his first adult competition, the Scottish International Piano Competition when he was 18.  The next year, in 1999, he won the Busoni Competition, after several years in which the first prize had not been awarded because no competitor's performances had been deemed worthy.  In 2000, the year Yundi Li was the winner, Kobrin was third at the XIV International Chopin Piano Competition in Warsaw. Kobrin later won the top prize at Japan's Hamamatsu competition.

In June 2005 he won the Van Cliburn International Piano Competition. Among his prizes included a $20,000 cash award, a compact disc recording, concert tours, and professional management both in the United States and Europe, a professional attire stipend and subsidized travel in the United States. 

Even before his Cliburn victory, Kobrin maintained an extensive schedule of engagements in Europe and Asia. He has performed with the Moscow Virtuosi, the Orchestre de la Suisse Romande, the Virtuosi of Salzburg Chamber Orchestra, the Moscow State Symphony Orchestra, the Rio de Janeiro Symphonic Orchestra, the English Chamber Orchestra, and the Osaka and Tokyo Symphony Orchestras. Since then, he has performed with countless other orchestras, including The New York Philharmonic, Royal Liverpool Philharmonic, Dallas Symphony Orchestra, and many more.

Kobrin has received many exceptional concert reviews, including The New York Times stating that "He surrendered neither the smoothness nor the dynamic fluidity that the modern piano allows, and he gave his sense of fantasy free rein ... creating an almost confessional spirit."   

Kobrin is especially interested in the music of the classical and romantic periods. He has recorded an all-Chopin compact disc along with the compact disc of some of his performances at the Van Cliburn competition. Quartz Music and Centaur Records have produced many well-known recordings by Kobrin, including his most recent Complete Chopin Sonatas album. Kobrin formerly taught at the Gnessin State Academy of Music in Moscow, but in the fall of 2009, he relocated to the United States. He has taught at the Schwob School of Music at Columbus State University and the Steinhardt School of Culture, Education, and Human Development at New York University. Kobrin joined the piano faculty at the Eastman School of Music in the fall of 2017. He continues to perform, mainly as a soloist and chamber musician, and frequently appears as a jury member at international piano competitions.

References

External links 
 Fort Worth Star-Telegram Guide to the 12th Van Cliburn Competition - King of the Cliburn
 Columbus State University Schwob School of Music Faculty Page 
 Personal Website

1980 births
Living people
Prize-winners of the Ferruccio Busoni International Piano Competition
Prize-winners of the International Chopin Piano Competition
Prize-winners of the Van Cliburn International Piano Competition
Russian classical pianists
Male classical pianists
Russian classical musicians
Moscow Conservatory alumni
Academic staff of Gnessin State Musical College
Steinhardt School of Culture, Education, and Human Development faculty
Columbus State University faculty
Eastman School of Music faculty
Russian expatriates in the United States
Centaur Records artists